Randall Leo Jones (born January 12, 1950), nicknamed "Junkman", is an American former professional baseball left-handed pitcher. He pitched in Major League Baseball for the San Diego Padres and New York Mets. Jones won the Cy Young Award with San Diego in 1976. The Padres retired his  35.

Jones attended Brea-Olinda High School in Brea, California,  and Chapman University in Orange, California.  He was known for his sinker and the large number of ground-ball outs he induced. He was inducted into the San Diego Padres Hall of Fame.

Professional baseball career
Jones was selected by the San Diego Padres in the fifth round of the 1972 Major League Baseball draft. He made his major league debut on June 16, 1973.

In 1974, Jones went 8–22 with a 4.45 ERA. He was able to turn it around in 1975 when he won 20 games and led the National League with a 2.24 ERA, earning The Sporting News Comeback Player of the Year Award. His best season was in 1976, when he went 22–14 with a 2.74 ERA, started the All-Star Game, won the National League Cy Young Award, and was named The Sporting News NL Pitcher of the Year. He was selected as the left-handed pitcher on The Sporting News NL All-Star Teams after the 1975 and 1976 seasons. At the All-Star break in July , Jones' record was 16–3, a win total that no one has equaled since.

Jones established the Major League season record for most chances accepted by a pitcher without an error (112 in 1976), tied ML pitchers records for highest season fielding percentage (1.000, 1976) and most assists in an inning (3, 9/28/75 – 3rd inning), and tied the NL pitchers season record for the most double plays with 12 in 1976.

Jones owns the distinction of recording a save for the NL in the 1975 All-Star Game and being the starting and winning pitcher the next year. During his last start of the 1976 season, he injured a nerve in his pitching arm that required exploratory surgery, and he was never quite able to regain his Cy Young form.

Jones pitched effectively for San Diego through the 1980 season. On December 15, 1980, he was traded to the New York Mets for José Moreno and John Pacella. After two years, Jones was released by the Mets, and signed with the Pittsburgh Pirates. He was released by the Pirates before the 1983 season started, thus ending his playing career.

His career win–loss record was just ; he remains the only starting pitcher to win a Cy Young Award but retire with a losing record. He was named an All-Star in 1975 and 1976. After his retirement, Jones' uniform No. 35 was retired by the Padres on May 9, 1997.

Post-playing career: coaching and catering

After retiring from Major League Baseball, Jones has coached young pitchers. His most prominent pupil was Barry Zito, a former Major League pitcher and the 2002 Cy Young Award winner while with the Oakland Athletics. He also is the owner of Randy Jones All American Grill, Randy Jones Big Stone Lodge,(now permanently closed) the home of his catering business Randy Jones Buckboard Catering. The Big Stone Lodge sells a barbecue sauce that bears Jones' name. Jones also owned the Randy Jones carwash in Poway in the late 70s and early 1980s. Randy is involved in the San Diego Padres local radio broadcast pregame and postgame show.

In 1996, Jones was inducted by the San Diego Hall of Champions into the Breitbard Hall of Fame honoring San Diego's finest athletes both on and off the playing surface. He was inducted as part of the inaugural class of the San Diego Padres Hall of Fame in 1999.

Jones can be heard live, every Tuesday at 1:00-2:00 (PST) on wsRadio.com. "Randy Jones on Baseball" covers everything baseball from his Hall of Fame/Legendary guests, to the latest news and an inside look at the Major League Season.

See also

 List of San Diego Padres team records
 San Diego Padres award winners and league leaders

References

External links

Randy Jones Chornology & Facts at This Day In Baseball

1950 births
Living people
Cy Young Award winners
Chapman Panthers baseball players
National League All-Stars
National League ERA champions
National League wins champions
New York Mets players
San Diego Padres players
Major League Baseball pitchers
Baseball players from California
Sportspeople from Fullerton, California
Major League Baseball players with retired numbers
Major League Baseball broadcasters
San Diego Padres announcers
Alexandria Aces players
Tri-City Padres players
Anchorage Glacier Pilots players